Simon Matthew Martin (born 1976) is a Northern Irish international lawn bowler.

Bowls career

International
Martin was selected for the combined Irish team that competed in the 2016 World Outdoor Bowls Championship. He was part of the fours team with Martin McHugh, Neil Mulholland and Ian McClure that won a bronze medal in Christchurch.

Two years later, he was selected as part of the Northern Ireland team for the 2018 Commonwealth Games on the Gold Coast in Queensland.

National
Martin is a four times National champion after winning events at the Irish National Bowls Championships, which included the singles in 2021.

He also won the fours gold in 2016, 2019 and 2022.

References

1976 births
Irish male lawn bowls players
Living people
Male lawn bowls players from Northern Ireland
Bowls players at the 2018 Commonwealth Games
Commonwealth Games competitors for Northern Ireland